A Gunn diode, also known as a transferred electron device (TED), is a form of diode, a two-terminal semiconductor electronic component, with negative resistance, used in high-frequency electronics. It is based on the "Gunn effect" discovered in 1962 by physicist J. B. Gunn. Its largest use is in electronic oscillators to generate microwaves, in applications such as radar speed guns, microwave relay data link transmitters, and automatic door openers.

Its internal construction is unlike other diodes in that it consists only of N-doped semiconductor material, whereas most diodes consist of both P and N-doped regions. It therefore conducts in both directions and cannot rectify alternating current like other diodes, which is why some sources do not use the term diode but prefer TED. In the Gunn diode, three regions exist: two of those are heavily N-doped on each terminal, with a thin layer of lightly n-doped material between. When a voltage is applied to the device, the electrical gradient will be largest across the thin middle layer. If the voltage is increased, the current through the layer will first increase, but eventually, at higher field values, the conductive properties of the middle layer are altered, increasing its resistivity, and causing the current to fall. This means a Gunn diode has a region of negative differential resistance in its current–voltage characteristic curve, in which an increase of applied voltage, causes a decrease in current. This property allows it to amplify, functioning as a radio frequency amplifier, or to become unstable and oscillate when it is biased with a DC voltage.

Gunn diode oscillators

The negative differential resistance, combined with the timing properties of the intermediate layer, is responsible for the diode's largest use: in electronic oscillators at microwave frequencies and above. A microwave oscillator can be created simply by applying a DC voltage to bias the device into its negative resistance region. In effect, the negative differential resistance of the diode cancels the positive resistance of the load circuit, thus creating a circuit with zero differential resistance, which will produce spontaneous oscillations. The oscillation frequency is determined partly by the properties of the middle diode layer, but can be tuned by external factors. In practical oscillators, an electronic resonator is usually added to control frequency, in the form of a waveguide, microwave cavity or YIG sphere. The diode is usually mounted inside the cavity. The diode cancels the loss resistance of the resonator, so it produces oscillations at its resonant frequency. The frequency can be tuned mechanically, by adjusting the size of the cavity, or in case of YIG spheres by changing the magnetic field. Gunn diodes are used to build oscillators in the 10 GHz to THz frequency range.

Gallium arsenide Gunn diodes are made for frequencies up to 200 GHz, gallium nitride materials can reach up to 3 terahertz.

History

The Gunn diode is based on the Gunn effect, and both are named for physicist J. B. Gunn. At IBM in 1962, he discovered the effect because he refused to accept inconsistent experimental results in gallium arsenide as "noise", and determined the cause. Alan Chynoweth, of Bell Telephone Laboratories, showed in June 1965 that only a transferred-electron mechanism could explain the experimental results. It was realized that the oscillations he detected were explained by the Ridley–Watkins–Hilsum theory, named for British physicists Brian Ridley, Tom Watkins and Cyril Hilsum who in scientific papers in 1961 showed that bulk semiconductors could display negative resistance, meaning that increasing the applied voltage causes the current to decrease.

The Gunn effect, and its relation to the Watkins–Ridley–Hilsum effect entered electronics literature in the early 1970s, e.g. in books on transferred electron devices and, more recently on nonlinear wave methods for charge transport.

How it works 

The electronic band structure of some semiconductor materials, including gallium arsenide (GaAs), have another energy band or sub-band in addition to the valence and conduction bands which are usually used in semiconductor devices. This third band is at a higher energy than the normal conduction band and is empty until energy is supplied to promote electrons to it. The energy comes from the kinetic energy of ballistic electrons, that is, electrons in the conduction band but moving with sufficient kinetic energy such that they are able to reach the third band.

These electrons either start out below the Fermi level and are given a sufficiently long mean free path to acquire the needed energy by applying a strong electric field, or they are injected by a cathode with the right energy. With forward voltage applied, the Fermi level in the cathode moves into the third band, and reflections of ballistic electrons starting around the Fermi level are minimized by matching the density of states and using the additional interface layers to let the reflected waves interfere destructively.

In GaAs the effective mass of the electrons in the third band is higher than those in the usual conduction band, so the mobility or drift velocity of the electrons in that band is lower. As the forward voltage increases, more and more electrons can reach the third band, causing them to move slower, and current through the device decreases. This creates a region of negative differential resistance in the voltage/current relationship.

When a high enough potential is applied to the diode, the charge carrier density along the cathode becomes unstable, and will develop small segments of low conductivity, with the rest of the cathode having high conductivity. Most of the cathode voltage drop will occur across the segment, so it will have a high electric field. Under the influence of this electric field it will move along the cathode to the anode. It is not possible to balance the population in both bands, so there will always be thin slices of high field strength in a general background of low field strength. So in practice, with a small increase in forward voltage, a low conductivity segment is created at the cathode, resistance increases, the segment moves along the bar to the anode, and when it reaches the anode it is absorbed and a new segment is created at the cathode to keep the total voltage constant. If the voltage is lowered, any existing slice is quenched and resistance decreases again.

The laboratory methods that are used to select materials for the manufacture of Gunn diodes include angle-resolved photoemission spectroscopy.

Applications 

Because of their high frequency capability, Gunn diodes are mainly used at microwave frequencies and above. They can produce some of the highest output power of any semiconductor devices at these frequencies. Their most common use is in oscillators, but they are also used in microwave amplifiers to amplify signals. Because the diode is a one-port (two terminal) device, an amplifier circuit must separate the outgoing amplified signal from the incoming input signal to prevent coupling. One common circuit is a reflection amplifier which uses a circulator to separate the signals. A bias tee is needed to isolate the bias current from the high frequency oscillations.

Sensors and measuring instruments 
Gunn diode oscillators are used to generate microwave power for: airborne collision avoidance radar, anti-lock brakes, sensors for monitoring the flow of traffic, car radar detectors, pedestrian safety systems, "distance travelled" recorders, motion detectors, "slow-speed" sensors (to detect pedestrian and traffic movement up to 85 km/h (50 mph)), traffic signal controllers, automatic door openers, automatic traffic gates, process control equipment to monitor throughput, burglar alarms and equipment to detect trespassers, sensors to avoid derailment of trains, remote vibration detectors, rotational speed tachometers, moisture content monitors.

Radio amateur use 
By virtue of their low voltage operation, Gunn diodes can serve as microwave frequency generators for very low powered (few-milliwatt) microwave transceivers called Gunnplexers. They were first used by British radio amateurs in the late 1970s, and many Gunnplexer designs have been published in journals. They typically consist of an approximately 3 inch waveguide into which the diode is mounted. A low voltage (less than 12 volt) direct current power supply, that can be modulated appropriately, is used to drive the diode. The waveguide is blocked at one end to form a resonant cavity and the other end usually feeds a horn antenna. An additional "mixer diode" is inserted into the waveguide, and it is often connected to a modified FM broadcast receiver to enable listening of other amateur stations. Gunnplexers are most commonly used in the 10 GHz and 24 GHz ham bands and sometimes 22 GHz security alarms are modified as the diode(s) can be put in a slightly detuned cavity with layers of copper or aluminium foil on opposite edges for moving to the licensed amateur band.
Typically, the mixer diode if intact is reused in its existing waveguide and these parts are well known for being extremely static sensitive.
On most commercial units this part is protected with a parallel resistor and other components and a variant is used in some Rb atomic clocks.
The mixer diode is useful for lower frequency applications even if the Gunn diode is weakened from use, and some amateur radio enthusiasts have used them in conjunction with an external oscillator or n/2 wavelength Gunn diode for satellite finding and other applications.

Radio astronomy 
Gunn oscillators are used as local oscillators for millimeter-wave and submillimeter-wave radio astronomy receivers. The Gunn diode is mounted in a cavity tuned to resonate at twice the fundamental frequency of the diode. The cavity length is changed by a micrometer adjustment. Gunn oscillators capable of generating over 50 mW over a 50% tuning range (one waveguide band) are available.

The Gunn oscillator frequency is multiplied by a diode frequency multiplier for submillimeter-wave applications.

References

Diodes
Microwave technology
Terahertz technology